Sicus abdominalis is a species of fly from the genus Sicus in the family Conopidae.

References 

Parasitic flies
Conopidae
Insects described in 1915
Taxa named by Otto Kröber
Diptera of Europe